The Frank H. Netter M.D. School of Medicine at Quinnipiac University, also known colloquially as Quinnipiac Medical School, or simply "Netter," is a medical school located in North Haven, Connecticut. Established in 2010 (and welcoming its first class in 2013).

Establishment
The Frank H. Netter M.D. School of Medicine was established in 2010 with a $100 million investment from the family of Frank H. Netter, the renowned surgeon and medical illustrator. It received preliminary accreditation from the Association of American Medical Colleges (AAMC), preliminary accreditation from the Liaison Committee on Medical Education (LCME), and full accreditation from the Connecticut State Board of Education in 2012. It welcomed its first class in 2013. The school of medicine received full accreditation from the LCME in February 2017.

Netter is one of about a dozen new medical schools established in anticipation of increased demand for medical professionals following the passage of the Patient Protection and Affordable Care Act and the aging of the baby boomer generation. Upon opening, it had a strong message that highlighted its desire for graduates to pursue primary care. However, over the years, as students started to match into competitive residencies such as orthopedics, plastic surgery, ophthalmology, dermatology, general surgery, etc. at some of the top programs in the country, students are now encouraged to go into any field of medicine that they think will best suit them. Some students have been able to score in the top 99% percentile on Step 1 with similar success on their Step 2-CK. In addition, students are encouraged to engage in research that would aid in their application process to more competitive specialties. In its most recent years, Quinnipiac set up a home residency program that is based out of St. Vincent's Medical Center (Bridgeport). And as years pass and the reputation of Frank Netter graduates grows, more and more opportunities and career directions  will be paved for those that come later on.
For the class of 2023, there were 7,701 applicants for 95 spots. For matriculants, the mean MCAT score was 512, the mean total GPA was 3.6, and the mean age was 25. The estimated annual budget for a student is $73,141, which is comparable to other medical schools.

Curriculum
During the first two years, the majority of students' time is spent engaging in various learning modalities in the organ systems-based Foundation of Medicine (FOM) course. FOM includes a mix of traditional lectures and small group, team-based activities. Additionally, pre-clinical students spend one morning per week in the Clinical Arts and Sciences (CAS) portion of the curriculum in which they learn and practice clinical skills, often with the help of standardized patients.

Students participate in the longitudinal Medical Student Home (MeSH) program starting in their first semester, working one half-day each week in the offices of primary care doctors throughout their first three years of medical school. Students spend their third and fourth years rotating through internships in various departments at St. Vincent's Medical Center (Bridgeport), Saint Francis Hospital & Medical Center, Connecticut Children's Medical Center, and other affiliated hospitals (such as MidState Medical Center and Middlesex Hospital Connecticut). Quinnipiac completed its own 145,000 square foot medical facility on March 1, 2013. The Medical School facility is located adjacent to the facilities for the Schools of Health Sciences and Nursing, and students of all three schools are expected to interact frequently with each other through classes and the Center for Interprofessional Healthcare Education.

Throughout the entire medical school experience, each student pursues a capstone project in one of the following fields:
 Global, public, and community health 
 Health policy and advocacy 
 Health management and leadership 
 Health communication
 Medical education 
 Translational, clinical, and basic science research 
 Medical humanities
 Interdisciplinary Medicine
 Self-designed

References

 

Hamden, Connecticut
Universities and colleges in New Haven County, Connecticut
Quinnipiac University
Medical schools in Connecticut